The Double Hold-Up is a 1919 American short silent Western film directed by Phil Rosen and featuring Hoot Gibson.

Cast
 Hoot Gibson
 Josephine Hill
 Madge Hunt
 Clark Comstock
 Charles Brinley
 Robert Walker
 Harry Schumm

See also
 List of American films of 1919
 Hoot Gibson filmography

External links
 

1919 films
1919 Western (genre) films
1919 short films
American silent short films
American black-and-white films
Films directed by Phil Rosen
Silent American Western (genre) films
Universal Pictures short films
1910s American films